Masui (written: 増井 or 桝井) is a Japanese surname. Notable people with the surname include:

, Japanese baseball player
, Japanese equestrian
, Japanese biologist

Japanese-language surnames